Nika Giyayevich Gigolayev (born 22 September 1994) is a Russian football player. He plays for FC Dynamo Vladivostok.

Club career
He made his debut in the Russian Football National League for FC Kuban Krasnodar on 10 July 2021 in a game against FC Torpedo Moscow.

References

External links
 
 Profile by Russian Football National League

1994 births
Footballers from Tbilisi
Living people
Russian footballers
Association football midfielders
Russian Second League players
Russian First League players
FC Urozhay Krasnodar players